Abortion in South Carolina is currently legally performed up to 22 weeks gestation.

A 2021 law criminalizes abortion once embryonic cardiac activity is detectable, which is around six weeks after the first day of the woman’s last menstrual period. Representatives from The American College of Obstetricians and Gynecologists (ACOG) stated in a September 2021 Senate hearing that "contemporary ultrasound can detect an electrically induced flickering of a portion of the embryonic tissue," which differs structurally and functionally from both the lay understanding and medical definition of the term "heartbeat."  53% of South Carolina adults said in a poll that they support "a woman’s right to choose to have a safe and legal abortion," while 37% did not support it. In January 2023, the South Carolina Supreme Court struck down this law as violating the state's privacy clause under Article 1, Section 10 of the South Carolina Constitution.

The number of abortion clinics in South Carolina has fluctuated over the years, with fifteen in 1982, eighteen in 1992 and three in 2014. There were 5,714 legal abortions in 2014, and 5,778 in 2015.

History 
South Carolinian women have a long history of traveling outside the state to seek legal abortions. Critics of efforts by state lawmakers to restrict abortion access say it results in South Carolinian women needing to spend more money and travel greater distances for the procedure.

Legislative history 
By the end of the 1800s, all states in the Union except Louisiana had therapeutic exceptions in their legislative bans on abortions. In the 19th century, bans by state legislatures on abortion were about protecting the life of the mother given the number of deaths caused by abortions; state governments saw themselves as looking out for the lives of their citizens. By 1950, the state legislature would pass a law that stated that a woman who had an abortion or actively sought to have an abortion regardless of whether she went through with it was guilty of a criminal offense.

The state was one of 23 states in 2007 to have a detailed abortion-specific informed consent requirement. In 2013, state Targeted Regulation of Abortion Providers (TRAP) law applied to medication induced abortions and private doctor offices in addition to abortion clinics. Governor Nikki Haley signed legislation that brought into effect a 20-week abortion ban in 2016. At a ceremonial signing ceremony for the cameras, she was surrounded by children with disabilities.

Republican Representative Greg Delleney was the lead sponsor of South Carolina's law requiring that women view an ultrasound of a fetus before being allowed to have an abortion. He said the ultrasound would enable the woman to "determine for herself whether she is carrying an unborn child deserving of protection or whether it's just an inconvenient, unnecessary part of her body." Rep. John R. McCravy III prefiled HB 3020 in the South Carolina House of Representatives in December 2018. The bill, entitled the "Fetal Heartbeat Protection from Abortion Act", was introduced on January 8, 2018, and referred to the House Judiciary Committee. Previous attempts to pass fetal heartbeat bills in the South Carolina General Assembly failed. The state legislature was one of ten states nationwide that tried to pass similar legislation that year. In April 2019, by a vote of 70–31, the S.C. House of Representatives passed a "fetal heartbeat" bill. The measure passed after five hours of debate.

In February 2021, South Carolina passed a law which would outlaw almost all abortions in that state after a fetal heartbeat is detected; however, that law was blocked by a judge in March 2021.

In September 2022, the South Carolina Legislature failed in an attempt to ban abortion at fertilization due to objections from female legislators for being too strict. The legislature then failed to make stricter the state's existing 6-week abortion ban due to objections from the caucus that the proposed new law wasn't strict enough.

Judicial history 
The US Supreme Court's decision in 1973's Roe v. Wade ruling meant the state could no longer regulate abortion in the first trimester. (However, the Supreme Court overturned Roe v. Wade in Dobbs v. Jackson Women's Health Organization,  later in 2022.) The US Supreme Court heard Ferguson v. City of Charleston in 2001. On appeal, the Fourth Circuit had affirmed, but on the ground that the searches were justified as a matter of law by special non-law-enforcement needs. The Supreme Court had a 6–3 ruling in the case, which was about a South Carolina public hospital policy requiring all pregnant women to be drug tested. The Supreme Court ruled that the US Constitution's Fourth Amendment protected women against unreasonable search and seizures, which mandatory drug testing was. The US Supreme Court reasoned that the interest in curtailing pregnancy complications and reducing the medical costs associated with maternal cocaine use outweighed what it characterized as a "minimal intrusion" on the women's privacy.  The Supreme Court then agreed to hear the case. Justice Kennedy pointed out that all searches, by definition, would uncover evidence of crime, and this says nothing about the "special needs" the search might serve.  In this case, however, Kennedy agreed that "while the policy may well have served legitimate needs unrelated to law enforcement, it had as well a penal character with a far greater connection to law enforcement than other searches sustained under our special needs rationale."

2023 
In Planned Parenthood South Atlantic, et al. v. State of South Carolina, et al., the South Carolina Supreme Court struck down the state's six-week abortion ban and ruled that the state constitution's privacy clause included an implicit right to abortion.

In March 2023, Republican lawmakers proposed a bill, titled the South Carolina Prenatal Equal Protection Act of 2023, which would define fertilized eggs as human beings. The most notable legal ramification of such a change would be that those who obtain an abortion could be subject to the death penalty. The bill offers no exception for pregnant individuals seeking abortion due to sexual assault, incest, or poor fetal health. Such a bill would also create new legal obstacles for those looking to have children through assisted reproductive technology.

Clinic history 

Between 1982 and 1992, the number of abortion clinics in the state increased by three, going from fifteen in 1982 to eighteen in 1992. In 2014, there were three abortion clinics in the state. In 2014, 93% of the counties in the state did not have an abortion clinic. That year, 71% of women in the state aged 15–44 lived in a county without an abortion clinic. In 2017, there were two Planned Parenthood clinics, one of which offered abortion services, in a state with a population of 1,112,199 women aged 15–49. In 2018, there were three licensed abortion clinics in the state. They were in Charleston, Columbia and Greenville. The Charleston clinic was a Planned Parenthood clinic in West Ashley.

Statistics 
In the period between 1972 and 1974, the state had an illegal abortion mortality rate per million women aged 15–44 of between 0.1 and 0.9. In 1990, 411,000 women in the state faced the risk of an unintended pregnancy. There were around 5,600 women in South Carolina in 1995 who left the state to get an abortion. There were around 8,801 abortions performed in South Carolina in 1998.

In 2010, the state had nine publicly funded abortions, of which all were federally funded and none were state funded. In 2013, among white women aged 15–19, there were 660 abortions, 620 abortions for black women aged 15–19, 60 abortions for Hispanic women aged 15–19, and 40 abortions for women of all other races. In 2014, 42% of adults said in a poll by the Pew Research Center that abortion should be legal in all or most cases. There were around 5,600 women in the South Carolina in 2015 left the state to get an abortion.  This number was one of the highest in the United States. Only 5.9% of abortions performed in the state involved out-of-state residents in 2015. This contrasted with neighboring North Carolina and Georgia. 14.5% of all abortions in Georgia that year were for out-of-state residents, while 7.5% of all abortions performed in North Carolina were performed for out-of-state residents. There were around 11,000 abortions performed in South Carolina in 2017. That year, South Carolina had an infant mortality rate of 6.5 deaths per 1,000 live births.

Abortion rights views and activities

Protests 
Protesters participated in marches supporting abortion rights as part of a Stop the Bans movement in May 2019.

Anti-abortion views and activities

Views 
Between 1998 and 2017, the number of abortions that took place on a yearly basis in the state dropped by 5,112.  According to anti-abortion rights group South Carolina Citizens for Life this drop meant that harsh anti-abortion measures in the state worked.  According to South Carolina Citizens Executive Director Holly Gatling in regards to the number of women seeking abortions outside the state over the same period remaining unchanged, "South Carolina Citizens for Life is responsible for South Carolina, not for any other state where women who claim to be from South Carolina abort their children. [...] All we can do is work to reduce the number of abortions occurring in South Carolina, and we have done that and continue to do so."

Governor Nikki Haley said in 2016, "I'm not pro-life because the Republican Party tells me. [...] I'm pro-life because all of us have had experiences of what it means to have one of these special little ones in our life."

Charleston Republican Senator Larry Grooms said in 2018, "I believe that all life is sacred, that an unborn child has a right to life, just like a child that has already experienced birth."

South Carolina state Rep. Nancy Mace said in regard to the six-week "fetal heartbeat" abortion ban in 2019, when on the floor of the House during a 10-minute floor speech about an amendment she introduced, "I was gripping the podium so hard I thought I was going to pull it out of the floor. [...] I was angry at the language my colleagues were using. They were saying rape was the fault of the woman. They called these women baby killers and murderers. That language is so degrading toward women, particularly victims of rape or incest. And I said to myself I'm not going to put up with that bull----. I was nearly yelling into the mic. I gave a very passionate speech to my colleagues and that is what got the exception through."

References 

South Carolina
Healthcare in South Carolina
Women in South Carolina